Helena Makowska (née Woynowiczówna, 2 March 1893 – 22 August 1964) was a Polish actress. She appeared in more than 60 films between 1911 and 1958.

Early life
Helena Makowska was born Helena Woynowiczówna on 2 March 1893 to Ludwik Woyniewicz, a Polish engineer who worked for a Russian-Belgian company, and his wife, Stanisława (née Sauret). The family moved to Warsaw in 1903. There, Makowska attended high school and received her first theater roles.

At the age of 16, Makowska married lawyer Julian Makowski, but they divorced shortly after. In 1912, Makowska traveled to Milan, where she took singing lessons. In 1913, she debuted at the Opera as Amelia in Il ballo in maschera and acted as Elena in Mefistofele.

Her film debut was in the 1911 short An Autumn Sunset Dream. She next appeared in the film Romanticismo (1915), which was based on a famous play by Gerolamo Rovetta. Makowska played as Ophelia in Ruggero Ruggeri's Hamlet (1917), and as the seductress Elena in the comedy Goodbye Youth (1918) with Maria Jacobini. Makowska would go on to perform in some 40 Italian films before marrying actor Karl Falkenberg and moving to Munich in the early 1920s.

In the 1920s, she appeared in Dutch and German productions such as Judith (1923), Frauenmoral (1923), both directed by Theo Frenkel, Taras Bulba (1924), and The Shot in the Pavilion (1925) with Margarete Schlegel and Ernst Reicher, as well as Kochanka Szamoty (1927), which was her final Polish film.

In the early 1930s, Makowska married for a third time to Botteril, an Englishman, and returned to Poland, where she worked as an opera singer.

In 1939, when the Wehrmacht invaded Poland, Makowska was arrested as a British citizen and was deported to Berlin in 1940. As part of an exchange of prisoners, she was released in April 1943, whereupon she settled in England. There, she played in the theater ensemble of the Polish army, with whom she later made guest appearances in France, Belgium, and northern Germany.

In 1947, she returned to Rome, where she taught foreign languages and took on small film roles. Makowska's final screen appearance was in Arrivederci Firenze (1958).

Helena Makowska died in Rome on 22 August 1964. She is buried at Campo Verano.

Selected filmography
 Hamlet (1917)
 Goodbye Youth (1918)
 The Prince of the Impossible (1918)
 Circus People (1922)
 A Dying Nation (1922)
 Maciste and the Silver King's Daughter (1922)
 Judith (1923)
 Frauenmoral (1923)
 Love of Life (1924)
 Taras Bulba (1924)
 Modern Marriages (1924)
 The Four Last Seconds of Quidam Uhl (1924)
 The Terror of the Sea (1924)
 The Shot in the Pavilion (1925)
 The Secret of One Hour (1925)

References

External links

1893 births
1964 deaths
Burials at Campo Verano
Polish film actresses
Polish silent film actresses
Italian silent film actresses
20th-century Italian actresses
People from Kryvyi Rih
White Russian emigrants to the United States
20th-century Polish actresses
White Russian emigrants to France
Emigrants from the Russian Empire to France